Henry Tuke (24 March 1755 – 11 August 1814) co-founded with his father, William Tuke, the Retreat asylum in York, England, a humane alternative to the nineteenth-century network of asyla, based on Quaker principles.

He was the author of several moral and theological treatises which have been translated into German and French.

He was a subscriber to the African Institution, the body which set out to create a viable, civilized refuge for freed slaves in Sierra Leone, Africa.

Historic ship
The 1824 ship Henry Tuke, 365 tons, was built by Thatcher Magoun in Medford, MA, and owned by Daniel Pinckney Parker and John Chandler, Jr. It was a whaler in Warren, RI in 1846.

See also
Tuke family

References

English Quakers
English humanitarians
Penal system in England
English non-fiction writers
1755 births
1814 deaths
Henry
Whaling ships
Ships built in Medford, Massachusetts
English male non-fiction writers